William Hastings, 1st Baron Hastings KG (c. 1431 – June 1483) was an English nobleman. A loyal follower of the House of York during the Wars of the Roses, he became a close friend and one of the most important courtiers of King Edward IV, whom he served as Lord Chamberlain. At the time of Edward's death he was one of the most powerful and richest men in England.  He was executed following accusations of treason by Edward's brother and ultimate successor, Richard III. The date of his death is disputed; early histories give 13 June, which is the traditional date.

Biography

William Hastings, born about 1430–1431, was the eldest son of Sir Leonard Hastings (c. 1396 – 20 October 1455), and his wife Alice Camoys, daughter of Thomas de Camoys, 1st Baron Camoys.
Hastings succeeded his father in service to the House of York and through this service became close to his distant cousin the future Edward IV, whom he was to serve loyally all his life. He was High Sheriff of Warwickshire and High Sheriff of Leicestershire in 1455.

He fought alongside Edward at the Battle of Mortimer's Cross, and was present at the proclamation of Edward as king in London on 4 March 1461, and then when the new king secured his crown at the Battle of Towton shortly thereafter. He was knighted on the field of battle. With the establishment of the Yorkist regime, Hastings became one of the key figures in the realm, most importantly as Master of the Mint and Lord Chamberlain, an office he held for the duration of the reign, and which made him one of the most important means of access to the king. He was also created Baron Hastings, a title reinforced by grants of land and office, primarily in Leicestershire and Northamptonshire. In 1462, he was invested as a Knight of the Garter. Hastings' tenure as Master of the Mint occurred during the Great Bullion Famine and the Great Slump in England.

In 1474, he was awarded royal licence to crenellate at three of his landholdings in Leicestershire; at Ashby-de-la-Zouch, Kirby Muxloe, and at Bagworth. He built extensively at Ashby, mostly making additions to the pre-existing manor house built by the de la Zouch family in the thirteenth century. His greatest achievement at Ashby was the Hastings Tower. At Kirby Muxloe Castle he began an intricate fortified house of red brick, one of the first of its kind in the county. Thanks to English Heritage, the castles at Ashby and Kirby can still be seen, but nothing survives to indicate any construction at Bagworth.

His importance in these years is recorded in a number of sources, and was recognised by the greatest peer in the realm, Richard Neville, Earl of Warwick. In 1462, Warwick arranged for Hastings to marry his widowed sister, Katherine Neville. (Katherine's first husband, Lord Bonville, had been killed at St Albans in 1461, and their infant daughter, Cecily, succeeded to the Bonville titles and estates.)

Despite this matrimonial relationship with the Nevilles, when Warwick drove Edward IV into exile in 1470, Hastings went with Edward, and accompanied the king back the following spring. Hastings raised troops for Edward in the English Midlands and served as one of the leading captains of the Yorkist forces at both Barnet and Tewkesbury.

His service, loyalty and ability, along with the fall of his Neville in-laws, made Hastings even more important during the second half of Edward IV's reign. He continued to serve as Chamberlain, and was awarded the position of Chamberlain of the Exchequer in 1471, which he held until 1483. He was also appointed Lieutenant of Calais, which made him an important player in foreign affairs, and given authority over an increasingly large section of the English Midlands. At court, he was involved in two lengthy feuds with members of Queen Elizabeth Woodville's family, most notably with her son Thomas Grey, first Marquess of Dorset.

Death

After the death of Edward IV on 9 April 1483, the Dowager Queen appointed family members to key positions and rushed to expedite the coronation of her young son Edward V as king, circumventing Richard, Duke of Gloucester, whom the late king had appointed Lord Protector. Hastings, who had long been friendly with Richard and hostile to the Woodvilles, was a key figure in checking the Dowager Queen's manoeuvres. While keeping the Woodvilles in check in London, Hastings kept Richard closely informed of their proceedings and asked him to hasten to London. Richard intercepted the young king, who was on his way to London, with his Woodville relatives. Hastings then supported Richard's formal installation as Lord Protector and collaborated closely with him in the royal council.

Affairs changed dramatically on 13 June 1483 during a council meeting at the Tower of London: according to contemporaries, Richard, supported by the Duke of Buckingham, accused Hastings and two other council members of having committed high treason by conspiring against his life with the Woodvilles. The contemporary (1483) account of Domenico Mancini records Richard's claim that those who were arrested "had come with concealed weapons so that they could be the first to unleash a violent attack"; this was later confirmed in a public proclamation. While the other alleged conspirators were imprisoned, Hastings was beheaded. The timing of his execution is disputed, although Charles Ross, in his biography of Richard III, argued for the traditional date of 13 June.

The summary execution of the popular Hastings was controversial among contemporaries and has been interpreted differently by historians and other authors. The traditional account, harking back to authors of the Tudor period, including William Shakespeare, considered the conspiracy charge invented and merely a convenient excuse to remove Lord Hastings, who was known for his loyalty to the dead King Edward IV and his heirs, as while he remained alive he would have been too formidable an obstacle to Richard's own plans to seize the throne. Others have been more open to the possibility that such a conspiracy did in fact exist and that Richard may have reacted to secure his own position. Clements R. Markham argues that Hastings was executed one week after his arrest on 20 June 1483, and after a trial. Several witnesses were present, hence a treason trial could have been conducted at an ad hoc Court of Chivalry convened by Richard as High Constable of England.

Despite the accusation of treason, no attainder was issued against Lord Hastings which again suggests a trial by the Court of Chivalry which had no power to attaint. Hence, his wife and sons were allowed to inherit his lands and properties. Hastings was buried in the north aisle of St George's Chapel, Windsor, next to his friend King Edward IV.

In literature
He is portrayed in two of Shakespeare's plays: Henry VI, Part 3 and Richard III.

In Al Pacino's documentary Looking for Richard, Lord Hastings is played by actor Kevin Conway.

Family
Hastings married, before 6 February 1462, Katherine Neville, sister of Richard Neville, Earl of Warwick, known as "Warwick the Kingmaker," and widow of William Bonville, 6th Baron Harington, slain at the Battle of Wakefield on 30 December 1460, by whom he had had four sons and two daughters:

Edward Hastings, 2nd Baron Hastings, who married Mary Hungerford.
Sir William Hastings.
Sir Richard Hastings, who married, and had two daughters and coheirs, Elizabeth Hastings, who married John Beaumont of Gracedieu, Leicestershire, Master of the Rolls, and Mary Hastings, who married Thomas Saunders of Harringworth, Northamptonshire.
George Hastings.
Anne Hastings, who married her father's ward, George Talbot, 4th Earl of Shrewsbury.
Elizabeth Hastings.

Notes

References

Sources

Further reading

Brondarbit, Alexander. Political Power-Brokers and the Yorkist State, 1461-1485 (Woodbridge, 2020)
Carpenter, Christine.  The Wars of the Roses (Cambridge, 1997)

Dunham, William Huse. Lord Hastings' indentured retainers, 1461–1483 (New Haven, 1955)
Hancock, Peter A. – Richard III and the Murder in the Tower (2009)
Horrox, Rosemary.  Richard III : a study of service (Cambridge, 1989)
Kendall, Paul Murray, Richard III, London, Allen & Unwin (1955)
Ross, Charles.  Edward IV (Berkeley, 1974)
Ross, Charles. Richard III (1981)
Seward, Desmond.  A Brief History of the Wars of the Roses (Robinson, 1995)
 

|-

|-

|-

1430s births
1483 deaths
Masters of the Mint
People of the Wars of the Roses
Executed politicians
People executed under the Yorkists
Executions at the Tower of London
High Sheriffs of Leicestershire
High Sheriffs of Warwickshire
William Hastings, 1st Baron Hastings
Knights of the Garter
Executed English people
People executed under the Plantagenets by decapitation
Sheriffs of Warwickshire
Barons Hastings
Burials at St George's Chapel, Windsor Castle